Carlynton Junior/Senior High School is a public school which is located in the borough of Carnegie in Allegheny County, Pennsylvania.

History
The high school serves students from the boroughs of Carnegie, Crafton and Rosslyn Farms. The school's mascot is the Golden Cougar. The school is part of the Carlynton School District.

References

Schools in Allegheny County, Pennsylvania
Public middle schools in Pennsylvania
Public high schools in Pennsylvania